Andrea Priscila Crespo Granda (b. 4 October 1983) is an Ecuadorian writer.

Biography
Andrea Crespo was born on 4 October 1983 in Guayaquil, Ecuador.

In September 2013, Crespo published her first work L.A. Monstruo through Editorial Cadáver Exquisito. In the book, which uses the structure of the Pentateuch, Crespo addresses femininity, masculinity, and power in politics through the life of her main character.

In December of that year, the selling of Crespo's poems began at the Casa Morada in Guayaquil.

Her next book, Libro Hémbrico, won the House of Ecuadorian Culture's David Ledesma Vásquez National Poetry Contest in March 2017. The contents of the book focuses on topics such as body acceptance and femininity.

Works
 L.A. Monstruo (2013)
 Registro de la habitada (2016)
 Libro Hémbrico (2019)

Citations

Living people
1983 births
People from Guayaquil
Ecuadorian women poets
21st-century Ecuadorian women writers
Ecuadorian feminists